An autopatch, sometimes called a phone patch, is a feature of an amateur radio (or other type of two-way radio) repeater or base station to access an outgoing telephone connection.  Users with a transceiver capable of producing touch tones (DTMF signals) can make a telephone call, typically limited by settings in the autopatch module to be only to flat-rate numbers, such as local calls or toll-free numbers.

Phonepatch vs. mobile telephony 
The fact of connecting a ham radio station to a telephone network exists from the beginning of the ham radio operators, even commercially, as the case of Carterfone (with lawsuits filed by the companies to which it was connected), but it was not possible to talk about mobile telephony until the arrival of the cellular network AMPS, initially using a car phone as the cellular terminal, and finally with the arrival of the DynaTAC, the first mobile phone "properly talking" (being able to hold the whole unit in the hand).

The term phone patch more accurately describes a system that is dialed and connected to the telephone network by a user manually operating a ham radio base station, which was more common before computer technology made automation of the process easier.

Uses 
This feature is primarily used by radio amateurs to provide emergency telephone connectivity to places that have lost their telephone network access.  An amateur radio operator with a transceiver installed in their vehicle may provide telephone network access from dozens of miles away, depending on the frequencies of the involved repeater/base station, the power of the transceiver, band conditions, and the gain of the antennas on both ends.

In the United States, autopatch users are required to hang up if they encounter music on hold, as the Federal Communications Commission regulations prohibit music on amateur radio frequencies.

See also 

 Carterfone

References

Bibliography 
 Albert Lee: How to talk to Vietnam free. In: Popular Mechanics, September 1970, Page 108–110.

Amateur radio
Telephony